Kids on Site is a first-person simulation video game, featuring full-motion video for its primary gameplay. It was produced for the Sega CD and later ported to the DOS operating system for PC systems and Macintosh. A 32X version was planned but never released. Versions for PlayStation 4 and Windows via Steam were re-released by Limited Run Games, Screaming Villains and Flash Film Works on June 14, 2022.

Gameplay 
This was a construction game for kids, where they watched videos and then got to "operate" heavy machinery on a construction site. This includes a steamroller, a wrecking ball, an excavator and a bulldozer.

Production 
The project was produced by Digital Pictures, directed by Heidi Holman and starred Larry Grennan, Scott McClain and Robin Joss. It was programmed by Richard Levine from a concept by Kevin Welsh.

Reception 
Kids on Site was awarded the "1995 Parents Choice Approval Award" and CD-ROM Magazine said it "captured all of the fun of playing with heavy machinery with the added advantage that your kids... won't come home full of dirt."

References

External links 
 
 Kids on Site at MobyGames

1994 video games
Cancelled Sega 32X games
Children's educational video games
Classic Mac OS games
DOS games
Full motion video based games
Sega CD games
Digital Pictures
Vehicle simulation games
Video games developed in the United States
PlayStation 4 games
Windows games